Thomas Gossland (born May 10, 1989) is a Canadian competition swimmer who represented Canada at the 2012 Summer Olympics in the men's 4×100-metre freestyle relay.  Gossland finished tenth in the relay with his teammates Brent Hayden, Richard Hortness and Colin Russell.

Gossland grew up and learned to swim in Nanaimo.  He then moved to Vancouver in 2007 to attend the University of British Columbia, where he competed with the UBC Thunderbirds, UBC's swimming team, and broke records set by Hayden, a future team member in the relay.  He then earned a spot on the 2012 Canadian Olympic team at the Olympic trials.

References

1989 births
Living people
Canadian male freestyle swimmers
Olympic swimmers of Canada
People from Richmond, British Columbia
Sportspeople from British Columbia
Swimmers at the 2012 Summer Olympics
UBC Thunderbirds swimmers
University of British Columbia alumni
20th-century Canadian people
21st-century Canadian people